James Henry Edgar (born 1882) was an English professional footballer who played as a winger for Sunderland.

References

1882 births
Footballers from Northumberland
English footballers
Association football wingers
Birtley F.C. players
Sunderland A.F.C. players
Hebburn Argyle F.C. players
English Football League players
Year of death missing